Litwack is a surname. Notable people with the surname include:

Georgia Litwack (1922–2020), American photographer and photojournalist
Harry Litwack (1907–1999), American basketball coach
Leon Litwack (1929–2021), American historian 
Katherine Litwack (born 1986), American actress